Yaar? or Yaar may refer to:
 Yaar? (film), a 1985 Indian Tamil-language film
 Yaar? (TV series), a 2017 Singaporean Tamil-language TV series
 Yaar (book), a 2018 Nepali autobiography by Nayan Raj Pandey
Yaara, 2020 Indian crime action film by Tigmanshu Dhulia

See also
Yaari (disambiguation)
Yaarana (disambiguation)